Eugenio Vélez Vancomper (born May 16, 1982) is a Dominican former professional baseball utility player. He has played in Major League Baseball (MLB) for the San Francisco Giants and Los Angeles Dodgers.

Career

Toronto Blue Jays 
Vélez's career began when the Toronto Blue Jays signed him on August 27, 2001. He had to beg his mother, who wanted him to be an engineer, to sign for him (because he was only 19), but she reluctantly did. He began his professional career with the Pulaski Blue Jays in 2003. After three solid years in the minors, he was selected by the San Francisco Giants from the Toronto Blue Jays in the 2005 minor league Rule 5 draft.

San Francisco Giants 
In 2006, the Giants assigned Vélez to the A Augusta GreenJackets. He had an exceptional year, winning the South Atlantic League's Most Valuable Player award.  He won the award by batting .315 with 63 extra base hits, 64 stolen bases and organization-high 91 runs batted in.  The following year, he was placed on the Giants' 40-man roster. He started the year with the AA Connecticut Defenders, but he played so well he earned a promotion to the AAA Fresno Grizzlies. However, he only played four games with Fresno before the Giants called him up for the first time. He made his debut on September 5, as a pinch hitter, as the Giants beat the Colorado Rockies 5-3. He finished the year with four stolen bases, although he only had three hits in 11 at-bats (in addition to two walks).
In 2008, Vélez made the Giants out of spring training, but he was sent down to the Grizzlies in May for Travis Denker. After playing well at Fresno, though, he was recalled on July 8, 2008. On August 30, 2008, he hit his first career home run against the Cincinnati Reds.

In 2009, Vélez once again made the Giants out of spring training. He would play in both San Francisco and Fresno during the year, but he spent the majority of time with the Giants. He finished the year with an acceptable .267 batting average. Vélez made the Opening Day roster in 2010. His first appearance of the season came in the Giants' 10-4 victory to complete a three-game sweep of the Houston Astros at Minute Maid Park on April 7. He entered the contest replacing Mark DeRosa in left field as part of a double switch in the seventh inning. The front of his jersey read "SAN ." It was the second year in a row that Majestic Athletic, MLB's official uniform supplier, committed a jersey misspelling.

Vélez' poor play during the start of the '10 season led to his removal from the Giants active roster when the Giants acquired Pat Burrell. He was called up at times during the later part of the '10 season. On July 26, while sitting in the dugout during a Giants' 10-4 win over the Arizona Diamondbacks, Vélez was struck in the head by a foul ball, coincidentally off the bat of Burrell, and hospitalized briefly afterward. He was placed on the disabled list for a short time after that, but was eventually pronounced fine. However, coincidentally or not, once Velez returned to action in August, he would go hitless (in 9 at-bats) for the rest of the season, and then 0-for-37 the following season with the Los Angeles Dodgers (although he would hit well over .300 in minor league action in 2011.)

Los Angeles Dodgers
On December 13, 2010 he signed a minor league contract with an invite to spring training with the Los Angeles Dodgers. He joined the AAA Albuquerque Isotopes. He hit .339 in 55 games with the Isotopes and on July 4, 2011 he was called up to the Dodgers. On August 22, Vélez tied J. D. Drew for the worst offensive start for the Dodgers since 1919 by failing to get a hit in his first 25 at-bats. On September 23, he struck out three times to break a 75-year-old record for most at-bats in a season without a hit (36) and tie a  102-year-old record for most consecutive at-bats without a hit spanning more than one season (45).

In the last game of the season, Vélez grounded out as a pinch hitter in the eighth inning, finishing the year 0-for-37, the most at-bats in a season without a hit by a position player in Major League history. He also extended his overall hitless streak to 46 at-bats, breaking the record previously shared by Bill Bergen, Dave Campbell and Craig Counsell. On April 8, 2019, Chris Davis of the Baltimore Orioles broke the record when he recorded his 47th consecutive at bat without a hit.

On October 4, the Dodgers outrighted Vélez to AAA, removing him from the 40-man roster.

St. Louis Cardinals
On December 21, 2011, Vélez signed a minor league contract with the St. Louis Cardinals.

Toronto Blue Jays
Vélez returned to the Blue Jays organization in December 2012 by signing a minor league contract, with a spring training invitation.  He started the 2013 season on the roster of the Triple-A Buffalo Bisons. He was released on July 22.

Milwaukee Brewers
Vélez signed a minor league contract with the Milwaukee Brewers on July 26, 2013, and was assigned to the Triple-A Nashville Sounds.

Tampa Bay Rays
On December 12, 2014, he signed a minor league contract with the Tampa Bay Rays.

Tigres de Quintana Roo
On April 10, 2017, Velez signed with the Tigres de Quintana Roo of the Mexican Baseball League. He was released on April 20, 2017.

Criminal Sentence
Vélez and his brother, Algenis, were arrested in March 2020 with several weapons. In December 2022, the First Collegiate Court of Santo Domingo Province sentenced Vélez and his brother to prison for 10 years for arms trafficking.

The court ruled under the legal classification of association of criminals, carrying, illegal possession of a firearm. Both were sent to the San Pedro de Macorís Correction and Rehabilitation Center.

At the moment of his arrest, he was aboard a Mercedes Benz where the authorities seized several illegal weapons. The Dominican National Police seized a 5.6-millimeter caliber rifle, M15, two chargers, and 34 capsules.

Then, the Public Prosecutor’s Office searched the home of Vélez and his brother, where they found a Waltler brand pistol, model P22, 22 mm caliber, with its charger and six capsules, all of them illegal.

The former Major League Baseball player and his brother were brought to justice accused of belonging to a criminal network that was dedicated to illegally buying, trading and distributing firearms in the territory of the Dominican Republic.

See also
Rule 5 draft results

References

External links

1982 births
Living people
Águilas Cibaeñas players
Águilas de Mexicali players
Albuquerque Isotopes players
Auburn Doubledays players
Augusta GreenJackets players
Buffalo Bisons (minor league) players
Cañeros de Los Mochis players
Connecticut Defenders players
Dominican Republic expatriate baseball players in Mexico
Dominican Republic expatriate baseball players in the United States
Durham Bulls players
Estrellas Orientales players
Fresno Grizzlies players
Lansing Lugnuts players
Los Angeles Dodgers players
Major League Baseball outfielders
Major League Baseball players from the Dominican Republic
Memphis Redbirds players
Mexican League baseball left fielders
Mexican League baseball second basemen
Nashville Sounds players
Pulaski Blue Jays players
San Francisco Giants players
Scottsdale Scorpions players
Sportspeople from San Pedro de Macorís
Tigres de Quintana Roo players
Toros del Este players